God's Father is a mixtape by American rapper Lil B. It was released on February 27, 2012 through Lil B's BasedWorld Records label. Featuring 34 tracks, the mixtape has received positive reviews from music critics.

Critical reception

Upon its release, God's Father mixtape received positive reviews from music critics. At Metacritic, which assigns a normalized rating out of 100 to reviews from critics, the album received an average score of 75, which indicates "generally favorable reviews", based on 4 reviews. Chris Letso of Beats per Minute wrote: "God's Father is nearly two hours long, and it's actually good." Letso also thought that "the cohesiveness of God’s Father in the face of all these approaches is what makes it a great mixtape." Pitchfork critic Jayson Greene stated: "It's probably his most immersive single release--or album, or mixtape, or emanation, or whatever--in a year and a half, better than both Based God Velli and I'm Gay." Mike Powell of Spin described the album as "the most fulfilling Lil B release yet." XXL magazine's Adam Fleischer was more mixed in his review and thought: "His quick delivery is impressive and B shows that he actually owns the technical skills to properly ride a beat—even though he doesn’t often choose to employ them." Nevertheless, Fleischer also further wrote: "How long his self-professed revolution lasts and in which direction the quality heads remains to be seen, but there’s no doubt that Lil B won’t be slowing down any time soon."

Track listing

 "The BasedGods Layer" — 4:02
 "I Own Swag" — 3:28
 "Fuck Ya Money" — 4:08
 "Februarys Confessions" — 4:30
 "Buss Em 4 Points" — 3:00
 "Tropics" — 4:00
 "Real Hip Hop 2012" — 4:04
 "Keep It 100" — 4:19
 "Fonk Ain't Dead" — 2:49
 "Feds At My Doh" — 4:07
 "Remy" — 3:08
 "Flowers Rise" — 2:21
 "God Help Me" — 4:24
 "Breath Slow" — 3:35
 "I Aint Neva Won" — 3:24
 "Let It Drop" — 5:21
 "Gods Father" — 2:18
 "Be A Star" — 2:09
 "Deep Ass Thoughts" — 3:50
 "Go Dumb Tonight" — 2:13
 "Bitch Im Bussin" — 2:53
 "Glourious BasedGod" — 3:19
 "See Ya" — 3:34
 "Flash" — 3:07
 "The Deal" — 3:20
 "Pain" — 3:54
 "Secrete Obsession" — 3:29
 "Turned Me Cold" — 3:40
 "Sf Mission Music" — 3:17
 "Im Just Livin" — 3:21
 "Words Not Spoken" — 3:51
 "Wake Up Mr Flowers 3mix" — 2:42
 "Water Is Dmg" — 2:35
 "I Love You" — 2:57

Personnel
Lil B —  vocals, lyrics
On Ice — production
Merkabah13 — production 
Lou Pocus — production

References

External links
 

2012 mixtape albums
Lil B albums
Cloud rap albums
Self-released albums
Albums free for download by copyright owner